Hurricane Dan may refer to:

People 
A nickname for Dan Rather, a journalist who often reported from the scene of landfalling hurricanes.

Entertainment 
Hurricane Dan: A Zombie Novel, an audio book written by Bret Wellman and narrated by Jeff Johnson.

See also 
Set indexes of tropical cyclones with related names:
 Hurricane Daniel
 Hurricane Danielle
 Hurricane Danny